Odonthalitus orinoma is a moth of the family Tortricidae. It is found in Guerrero, Mexico.

The length of the forewings is 7.5 mm. The forewings are pale cream with nearly uniform pale brown overscaling. The hindwings are pale grey brown.

References

Moths described in 1914
Euliini